The 2022–23 Portland Pilots women's basketball team represents the University of Portland in the 2022–23 NCAA Division I women's basketball season. The Pilots are led by fourth year coach Michael Meek. They play their homes games at Chiles Center and are members of the West Coast Conference.

Previous season 
The Pilots finished the season at 20–11 and 8–7 in WCC play to finish in fourth place. They defeated in the quarterfinals WCC women's tournament to Loyola Marymount before losing to BYU in the semifinals. They received an at-large bid to the WNIT they defeated Colorado State in the first round before losing to Oregon State in second round.

Offseason

Departures
Due to COVID-19 disruptions throughout NCAA sports in 2020–21, the NCAA announced that the 2020–21 season would not count against the athletic eligibility of any individual involved in an NCAA winter sport, including women's basketball. This meant that all seniors in 2020–21 had the option to return for 2021–22.

Recruiting
There were no recruiting classing class of 2022.

Roster

Schedule and results

|-
!colspan=9 style=| Exhibition

|-
!colspan=9 style=| Non-conference regular season

|-
!colspan=9 style=| WCC regular season

|-
!colspan=9 style=| WCC Women's Tournament

|-
!colspan=9 style=| NCAA Tournament

See also
 2022–23 Portland Pilots men's basketball team

References

Portland
Portland Pilots women's basketball seasons
Portland Pilots women's basketball
Portland Pilots women's basketball
Port
Port
Portland